Year 1372 (MCCCLXXII) was a leap year starting on Thursday (link will display the full calendar) of the Julian calendar.

Events 
 January–December 
 May – Owain Lawgoch makes a second attempt to take the throne of Wales, sailing with French support from Harfleur. Whilst attacking the island of Guernsey, he abandons the invasion in order to fight for France at La Rochelle.
 June 22 – Battle of La Rochelle: The French and the Castilians defeat the English. The Castilians gain control of the English Channel for the first time since 1340.
 July 10 – The Treaty of Tagilde is signed between Ferdinand I of Portugal and representatives of John of Gaunt of England, marking the beginning of the Anglo-Portuguese Alliance, which remains in effect into the 21st century.
 November 9 – Trần Duệ Tông succeeds his brother Trần Nghệ Tông as King of Vietnam.

 Date unknown 
 Encounter of Sintra: Twenty Portuguese knights rout four hundred Castilian infantrymen of the country.
 Peace is declared between the Kingdom of Sicily and the Kingdom of Naples.
 The Kingdom of Chūzan (in modern-day southern Japan) enters tributary relations with Ming dynasty China.
 Four-year-old Muhammad as-Said succeeds his father, Abu l-Fariz Abdul Aziz I, as Marinid Sultan of Morocco.
 Newaya Maryam succeeds his father, Newaya Krestos, as ruler of Ethiopia.
 The city of Aachen, Germany, begins adding a Roman numeral Anno Domini date to a few of its coins, the first city in the world to do so.

Births 
 February 18 – Ibn Hajar al-Asqalani, Islamic scholar (d. 1449)
 March 13 – Louis of Valois, Duke of Orléans, son of King Charles V of France (d. 1407)
 September 8 – Thomas Holland, 1st Duke of Surrey (d. 1400)
 October – John Hastings, 3rd Earl of Pembroke (d. 1389)
 approximate date
 Helena Dragaš, empress consort of Byzantium (d. 1450)
 Olivera, daughter of Lazar of Serbia and wife of Bayezid I

Deaths 
 January 11 – Eleanor of Lancaster, English noblewoman (b. 1318)
 March 19 – John II, Marquess of Montferrat (b. 1321)
 March 21 – Rudolf VI, Margrave of Baden
 August 24 – Casimir III, Duke of Pomerania (b. 1348)
 August 31 – Ralph de Stafford, 1st Earl of Stafford, English soldier (b. 1301)
 date unknown – Bagrat I of Imereti, King of Georgia

References